Napa or NAPA may refer to:

Places
 Napa, California, the county seat of Napa County, California
 Napa County, California, United States
 Napa River, California
 Napa Valley AVA, an "American Viticultural Area" designated wine region
 Rancho Napa, an 1838 Mexican land grant

Medicine
 NAPA (gene), N-ethylmaleimide-sensitive factor attachment protein, alpha
 N-Acetylprocainamide (acecainide), an anti-arrhythmic heart drug

Organizations
 NAPA Auto Parts, an American retailers' cooperative
 National Academy of Public Administration (United States), an American national academy
 National Amateur Press Association, the earliest amateur press association, founded in 1876 and still in existence
 The Nordic Institute in Greenland (Nunani Avannarlerni Piorsarsimassutsikkut Attaveqaat)
 North Adriatic Ports Association
 National APIDA Panhellenic Association, whose common abbreviation is NAPA

People

Surname
 Alex Napa (born 1976), Cook Islands footballer and manager
 Dylan Napa (born 1992), Australian rugby league player
 Ian Napa (born 1978), European bantamweight boxing champion
 Malachi Napa (born 1999), English footballer
 Selina Napa, Cook Islands politician and current Member of the Cook Islands Parliament

First name
 Napa Kiatwanchai (born 1967), Thai World Boxing Council strawweight champion

Schools
 Napa High School, Napa, California
 Napa Valley College, previously named Napa Junior College and Napa Community College, a community college in Napa Valley, California
 National Academy of Performing Arts, Karachi, Pakistan

Ships
 , various ships of the United States Navy
 , a passenger ferry operating in San Francisco Bay, California, United States

Other
 Napa cabbage, a type of Chinese cabbage
 Napa leather, a leather noted for its soft feel
 Napa platform, an Intel Centrino platform for laptop computers
 National Adaptation Programme of Action, a type of plan submitted to the United Nations Framework Convention on Climate Change by Least Developed Countries
 North American Phonetic Alphabet

See also 
 Cerro Napa, a volcano on the border between Bolivian and Chile
 Nappa (disambiguation)